Secu or SECU may refer to:

 Secu - a commune in Dolj County, Romania
 SECU - a common abbreviation for State Employees Credit Union
 North Carolina State Employees Credit Union
 Pennsylvania State Employees Credit Union
 South Carolina State Employees Credit Union
 State Employees Credit Union of New Mexico
 State Employees Credit Union of Maryland
 Washington State Employees Credit Union
 abbreviation for the Canadian House of Commons Standing Committee on Public Safety and National Security 
 SECU - an academic arm of the Southeastern Conference
 SECU (container) - Stora Enso Cargo Unit, a type of shipping container
 The ICAO airport code for Mariscal Lamar Airport in Cuenca, Ecuador